The Battle of Suceava was fought during the Moldavian Magnate Wars between the Polish–Lithuanian Commonwealth supported by Moldavian forces and the Principality of Transylvania supported by Ottoman forces on December 12, 1595. Polish-Lithuanian forces under the command of Jan Potocki defeated the Transylvanian forces commanded by Ştefan Răzvan.

References

Further reading
 Mychajlo S. Hruševs·kyj, Andrzej Poppe, History of Ukraine-Rus': The Cossack age, 1654 - 1657, (2008) Canadian Inst. of Ukrainian Studies Press, page 471

Suceava 1595
Suceava 1595
Suceava 1595
Suceava (1595)
Military history of Romania
History of Suceava County
1595 in Europe